The Transcendental Études, S.139, are a set of twelve compositions for piano by Franz Liszt. They were published in 1852 as a revision of an 1837 set (which had not borne the title "d'exécution transcendante"), which in turn were – for the most part – an elaboration of a set of studies written in 1826.

History 

The genesis of the Transcendental Études goes back to 1826, when 15-year-old Liszt wrote a set of youthful exercises called the Étude en douze exercices (Study in twelve exercises), S.136. These pieces were not particularly technically demanding. Liszt then returned to these pieces for thematic ideas, elaborating on them considerably, in the composition of the Douze Grandes Études (Twelve Grand Studies), S.137, which were published in 1837.

The Transcendental Études, S.139, are revisions of the Douze Grandes Études. This third and final version was published in 1852 and dedicated to Carl Czerny, Liszt's piano teacher, and himself a prolific composer of études. The set included simplifications for the most part: in addition to many other reductions, Liszt removed all stretches of intervals greater than a tenth, making the pieces more suitable for pianists with smaller hands. However, some actually regard the fourth étude of the final set, Mazeppa, more demanding than its 1837 version, because it is laid out differently, frequently altering and crossing the hands to create a "galloping" effect.

When revising the 1837 set of études into their final "Transcendental" versions, Liszt added programmatic titles in French and German to all but two of the pieces, Études Nos. 2 and 10. Editor Ferruccio Busoni later named those Fusées (Rockets) and Appassionata respectively. Still, others, including music publisher G. Henle Verlag refer to these pieces by their tempo indications, Molto vivace and Allegro agitato molto respectively.

Henle ranks Nos. 4 (Mazeppa), 5 (Feux follets), 7 (Eroica), 8 (Wilde Jagd), 10 (Allegro agitato molto) and 12 (Chasse-neige) as the most difficult of the set at difficulty 9 out of 9, according to its scale. The lowest difficulty is given to No. 3 (Paysage) at 6 out of 9.

Liszt's original idea was to write 24 études, one in each of the 24 major and minor keys. He completed only half of this project, using the neutral and flat key signatures. In 1897–1905 the Russian composer Sergei Lyapunov wrote his own set of Douze études d'exécution transcendante, Op. 11, continuing Liszt's cycle through the keys that Liszt had not used, namely the sharp keys, to "complete" the set of 24. Lyapunov's set of études was dedicated to the memory of Liszt, and bore titles as Liszt's set had done, with the final étude being entitled Élégie en mémoire de Franz Liszt.

Very few pianists have recorded the 1837 set, and even fewer have recorded the 1826 set (which really are works of Liszt's juvenilia). Leslie Howard is the only pianist to have recorded all three sets on a major label for international release, as part of his series of recordings for Hyperion of the complete solo piano music of Liszt.

Other works with a similar title 
Sergei Lyapunov, 12 Études d'exécution transcendante, Op. 11 (1897–1905)
Kaikhosru Shapurji Sorabji, Études transcendantes (100) (1940–44), commonly known as 100 Transcendental Studies
Brian Ferneyhough, Études transcendantales for mezzo-soprano and chamber ensemble (1982–85)

Selected recordings

References

External links 
 
 Discography of Liszt's Transcendental Studies

Études by Franz Liszt
1852 compositions
Music dedicated to students or teachers